Monument is the third album by alternative rock band Children Collide. Its release was announced just after lead single 'Sword to a Gunfight' was premiered on the Triple J breakfast show with Tom Ballard and Alex Dyson. It was made the Triple J feature album from 10 to 17 April.

The album cover was designed by Isobel Knowles

This is the last album to feature drummer Ryan Caesar. His departure was announced on 29 February 2012.

Track listing

Charts

References

2012 albums
Children Collide albums